

References

 S